The 2010 African Women's Championship was held in South Africa from 31 October to 14 November 2010. Seven national teams joined the host nation following a series of knock-out home and away ties. This tournament was also a qualification tournament for the 2011 FIFA Women's World Cup, with the two finalists, Nigeria and Equatorial Guinea qualifying for the finals in Germany.

Qualification

A total of 23 national teams entered qualification which has held over two rounds. In the preliminary round, the 18 lowest-ranked nations were drawn in pairs. The nine winners joined five other national teams in the first round, where the seven winners qualified for the finals.

Qualified teams

Squads

Group stage

The final tournament was held in Gauteng, South Africa from 31 October to 14 November 2010.  The seven first round winners joined the host in the finals. The draw took place on 21 September.

Matches were played at Sinaba Stadium in Daveyton and Makhulong Stadium in Tembisa (both located in the Ekurhuleni Metropolitan Municipality, Gauteng).

Where teams finish the group stage at an equal number of points, the ranking in the group is determined based on:
 greater number of points in matches between tied teams
 superior goal difference in matches between tied teams
 greater number of goals scored in matches between tied teams
 superior goal difference in all group matches
 greater number of goals scored in all group matches
 fair play criteria based on red and yellow cards received
 drawing of lots

Group A

All times are SAST (UTC+2)

Group B

All times are SAST (UTC+2)

Knockout stages

Knockout Map

Semifinals
All times are SAST (UTC+2)

Winners qualified for 2011 FIFA Women's World Cup.

Third place play-off

Final

Awards

References and notes

External links
 
 FIFA page on CAF Preliminary matches for 2011 Women's World Cup

 
2010
2011 FIFA Women's World Cup qualification
Women
Women's Football Championship
2010
CAF
October 2010 sports events in Africa
November 2010 sports events in Africa